Valery Ivanovich Meshkov (born 9 August 1945) is a former figure skater who competed for the Soviet Union. He is the 1964 Winter Universiade bronze medalist and a four-time Soviet national champion. His best ISU Championship result, seventh, came at the 1963 Europeans in Budapest, Hungary. He withdrew from the 1964 Winter Olympics in Innsbruck, Austria.

Results

References

Navigation

1945 births
Russian male single skaters
Soviet male single skaters
Figure skaters at the 1964 Winter Olympics
Olympic figure skaters of the Soviet Union
Living people
Figure skaters from Moscow
Universiade medalists in figure skating
Universiade bronze medalists for the Soviet Union
Competitors at the 1964 Winter Universiade